The Australian Church Record is an Australian Christian newspaper. It was founded in 1880, and is based in Sydney. It has historically represented the evangelical wing of the Anglican Church of Australia.

References

External links
 

Evangelical newspapers
Newspapers published in Sydney
Newspapers established in 1880
1880 establishments in Australia
Evangelical Anglicanism
Anglican newspapers and magazines